Dorothy Cimberg Finkelhor (February 22, 1902 – July 19, 1988) was an American academic, teacher, and speaker. She was the founder and first president of Point Park College in Pittsburgh.

She and her husband, Lawrence H. Finkelhor (aka L. Herbert Finkelhor), founded the Business Training College in downtown Pittsburgh in 1933. It eventually became Point Park University. Dr. Finkelhor, a native of New York City, was president of the college until 1971.

Death
Dorothy Finkelhor died on July 19, 1988, aged 86, at her home in Ocean Ridge, Florida. She was survived by her husband, three children and six grandchildren.

References

External links
 List of books written by the Finkelhors
 Pittsburgh and Beyond: The Experience of the Jewish Community

1902 births
1988 deaths
American educational theorists
20th-century American Jews
Schoolteachers from Pennsylvania
20th-century American women educators
Educators from New York City
People from New York City
People from Ocean Ridge, Florida
Point Park University people
20th-century American educators